Visa requirements for Samoa citizens are administrative entry restrictions by the authorities of other states placed on citizens of Samoa. As of 2 July 2019, Samoa citizens had visa-free or visa on arrival access to 130 countries and territories, ranking the Samoan passport 42nd in terms of travel freedom according to the Henley Passport Index.

Samoa signed a mutual visa waiver agreement with Schengen Area countries on 28 May 2015.

Visa requirements map

Visa requirements

Dependent, Disputed, or Restricted territories
Unrecognized or partially recognized countries

Dependent and autonomous territories

See also
Visa policy of Samoa
Samoan passport

References and Notes
References

Notes

Samoa
Foreign relations of Samoa